Borgosesia is a comune (municipality) in the Province of Vercelli in the Italian region Piedmont, located about  northeast of Turin and about  north of Vercelli.

The largest town in Valsesia, it is crossed by the Sesia River.

History

The town was founded in 14 BC by the native population, and later was called Seso by the Romans after their conquest. In the Middle Ages it was owned by the Dukes of Biandrate and, in the 17th century, by Spain.

Main sights
Sanctuary of Sant'Anna, an example of Sacro Monte
Parish church of Sts. Peter and Paul
Archaeological and Paleontological Museum "Carlo Conti"
Natural Park of Monte Fenera

References

External links
 Official website

 
Cities and towns in Piedmont